Escua is a genus of moths of the family Erebidae. The genus was erected by Francis Walker in 1858.

Species
Escua barzillai Schaus, 1911
Escua bilinea Schaus, 1911
Escua extollens Walker, 1858

References

Calpinae